

Rock  is a small village in east County Tyrone, Northern Ireland located approximately 5 miles south-west of Cookstown. The village and surrounding area is located mainly within the parish of Desertcreat.

Sport

Rock St. Patrick's GAC is the local Gaelic Athletic Association club.

The club has won the Ulster Junior Club Football Championship on three occasions (2007, 2014 and 2016).

Education
Sacred Heart Primary School

History

The village name was recorded originally as Baile na Carraige. A stone quarry later operated in the late 19th and early 20th centuries. A Mass rock exists in Tullyodonnell, half a mile from the village.

Notable people
Ellen Beck (1858–1924), Irish poet and writer

See also

List of villages in Northern Ireland
List of towns in Northern Ireland
The Troubles in Rock, County Tyrone

References

Villages in County Tyrone